Matuse Inc. is an American company focused on wetsuits and outdoor apparel for men and women. Matuse was founded in 2006 in San Diego, California. Co-founded by Matthew Larson and John Campbell, Matuse was established with the intention of creating sustainable wetsuits by using a premium material named Geoprene; an eco-friendly Japanese limestone rubber (an alternative to oil-based rubber). Later on, Matuse started creating other sustainable wetsuits made from a premium material named Geoflex; using water-based glues for seams and laminations, along with recycled nylons and rubber. 

Matuse's logo is derived from an ancient Taoist symbol that signifies three solid lines for heaven, three broken lines for Earth and a circle that represents the constant quest for perfection. Matuse's slogan is to make all their products "Ichiban," a Japanese phrase which means to make everything the best it can possibly be.

References

Companies established in 2006
Clothing companies based in California